The Rights and Equality Party (HEPAR) was a political party in Turkey, founded on 4 September 2008 by Osman Pamukoğlu, a former army general known for his military successes against the Kurdistan Workers' Party in the 1990s during the Kurdish–Turkish conflict.

The party's main manifest was the setting sovereignty, own based economical development and peace for Turkish citizens. The party had 8,273 members as of 2014.

The party claimed their ideology as being neither on the right nor left, above all with populist, nationalist aiming social justice for Turkish citizens. The party chairman Osman Pamukoğlu often mentioned Mustafa Kemal Atatürk's quote as "Our target is being a merged society with no classes and privileges."

The party gained 121,814 votes during the 2011 elections, comprising 0.28% of the votes.

The party announced its end of activities during an extraordinary convention on 21 April 2019.

References

2008 establishments in Turkey
2019 disestablishments in Turkey
Kemalist political parties
Political parties established in 2008
Political parties disestablished in 2019
Defunct political parties in Turkey
Defunct nationalist parties in Turkey
Populist parties
Turkish nationalist organizations
Syncretic political movements